is a Japanese former professional racing cyclist particularly known for his time trial skills. He won the Japanese National Time Trial Championships four times in 2002, 2003, 2007, and 2008. He also won the time trial event at the 2002 Asian Cycling Championships. In road race competitions, his best result was a victory in the 2003 Tour de Okinawa.

Palmares
2002
 1st Asian Time Trial Champion
 1st National Time Trial Championships
2003
 1st National Time Trial Championships
 1st Tour de Okinawa
2007
 1st National Time Trial Championships
2008
 1st National Time Trial Championships

References

External links

1972 births
Living people
Japanese male cyclists
Sportspeople from Hiroshima Prefecture
Asian Games medalists in cycling
Cyclists at the 2002 Asian Games
Cyclists at the 2006 Asian Games
Medalists at the 2006 Asian Games
Asian Games bronze medalists for Japan